Robert Michael Kimmitt (born December 19, 1947) was United States Deputy Secretary of the Treasury under President George W. Bush.  He was nominated by President Bush on June 29, 2005. The United States Senate unanimously confirmed him on July 29, 2005, and he was sworn into office on August 16, 2005.  Kimmitt served through the end of the Bush administration, leaving office on January 20, 2009.

Kimmitt served as acting Secretary of the Treasury from Friday, June 30, until Monday morning, July 10, following John W. Snow's resignation, but prior to Henry Paulson being sworn into office.

Early life and education 
Robert Kimmitt, born December 19, 1947 in Logan, Utah, graduated from Bishop Denis J. O'Connell High School in 1965.  Kimmitt graduated with distinction from the United States Military Academy at West Point in 1969. He received a law degree from Georgetown University in 1977, where he was editor in chief of Law & Policy in International Business.

Military service 
After being commissioned as a Regular Army officer in 1969 at West Point, Robert Kimmitt completed field artillery and airborne schools, and graduated first in his Ranger School class. He then served a 17-month combat tour with the 173rd Airborne Brigade in Vietnam (1970–1971), earning three Bronze Stars, the Purple Heart, the Air Medal, and the Vietnamese Cross of Gallantry. He was subsequently assigned to the 101st Airborne Division at Fort Campbell, Kentucky (1972–1974), where he completed Jumpmaster school and qualified as a Senior Parachutist. He retired in November 2004 as a major general in the Army Reserve.

Later career 

From 1976 to 1977 and 1978 to 1983, Robert Kimmitt was a member of the National Security Council staff. From 1977 to 1978, he served as a law clerk to Judge Edward A. Tamm of the United States Court of Appeals for the District of Columbia Circuit.  He served at the White House as National Security Council Executive Secretary and General Counsel from 1983 to 1985, with the rank of Deputy Assistant to the President for National Security Affairs. From 1985 to 1987, Robert Kimmitt served as General Counsel to the U.S. Treasury Department, where he received the Alexander Hamilton Award, as well as the Arthur S. Flemming Award for distinguished public service.

Kimmitt then left public service, and from 1987 to 1989, served as a partner in the law firm of Sidley & Austin.

Kimmitt resumed his public service career in 1989, serving as Under Secretary of State for Political Affairs until 1991. For his service during the Gulf Crisis and War, President George H. W. Bush presented Kimmitt with the Presidential Citizens Medal, the Nation's second-highest civilian award.  He served from 1991 to 1993 as United States Ambassador to Germany and was awarded the U.S. Defense Department Distinguished Public Service Award as well as Germany's Order of Merit.

Kimmitt was a managing director of Lehman Brothers from 1993 to 1997. He was a partner at Wilmer, Cutler & Pickering from 1997 to 2000. Kimmitt was Vice Chairman and President of Commerce One, a software company headquartered in the San Francisco Bay area. Robert Kimmitt was Chairman of the International Advisory Council of Time Warner, where he had served from July 2001 to February 2005 as Executive Vice President, Global Public Policy. From March through August 2005, he was also Senior International Counsel in the law firm of Wilmer Cutler Pickering Hale and Dorr.

Ambassador Kimmitt was Chairman of the CIA External Advisory Board from 2017-2021, Chairman of the State Department Foreign Affairs Policy Board from 2019-2021, and a member of the National Security Council Leadership Initiative from 2020-2021. During 1997 Kimmitt was a member of the National Defense Panel. From 1998 to 2005, he was a member of the Director of Central Intelligence's National Security Advisory Panel. He also served as a member of the Panel of Arbitrators of the World Bank's International Centre for the Settlement of Investment Disputes. Kimmitt is also a recipient of the CIA Director's Award.

In May 2007, he was mentioned in media reports as among the top candidates to be named president of the World Bank, a position ultimately filled by Robert Zoellick. Kimmitt was the independent chairman of the Deloitte Center for Cross-Border Investment from 2009–2012, and currently is Senior International Counsel at the WilmerHale law firm.

He has also served on many corporate boards, including United Defense, Lufthansa, and Siemens. On March 26, 2020 Facebook (now Meta) announced that Robert Kimmitt has been appointed by the company's board of directors as lead independent director.

Personal life 

Robert Kimmitt's father is Joseph Stanley Kimmitt (Stan), former Secretary of the Senate and army colonel, who died in 2004. Kimmitt's brother, Mark Kimmitt, is the former Assistant Secretary of State for Political-Military Affairs and former Deputy Assistant Secretary of Defense for Middle East. Kimmitt and his wife Holly Sutherland Kimmitt have two daughters, three sons, and ten grandchildren and reside in Arlington, Virginia. He is a member of the Council on Foreign Relations, the American Academy of Diplomacy, and the Trilateral Commission. He is Chairman Emeritus of the American Council on Germany and his foreign language is German.

References

External links 
 Bio at treas.gov
 "Reagan and Gadhafi" – Kimmitt's commentary on the 1981 "Line of Death" incident
 

1947 births
21st-century American politicians
Ambassadors of the United States to Germany
United States Army personnel of the Vietnam War
George W. Bush administration personnel
George W. Bush administration cabinet members
Georgetown University Law Center alumni
Grand Crosses with Star and Sash of the Order of Merit of the Federal Republic of Germany
Living people
People from Arlington County, Virginia
Politicians from Logan, Utah
Presidential Citizens Medal recipients
Recipients of the Air Medal
Under Secretaries of State for Political Affairs
United States Army generals
United States Deputy Secretaries of the Treasury
United States Military Academy alumni
Virginia Republicans
Wilmer Cutler Pickering Hale and Dorr partners
Acting United States Secretaries of the Treasury
Directors of Facebook
20th-century American diplomats